Longing is a 2017 Israeli comedy-drama film directed by Savi Gabizon. It was screened in the Contemporary World Cinema section at the 2017 Toronto International Film Festival. It was nominated for the Ophir Award for Best Film. The film takes place primarily in Acre, Israel.

Cast
 
 Asi Levi
 Neta Riskin

Awards
At the 2017 Jerusalem Film Festival, Longing won the award for best script, as well as the Audience Favorite Award. At the 2017 Ophir Awards, Longing had 13 nominations and won for Best Screenplay.

References

External links
 
 Israel Film Fund

2017 films
2017 comedy-drama films
Israeli comedy-drama films
2010s Hebrew-language films
Films shot in Israel
Films set in Israel